Monkey-Pockie-Boo is the second album by American jazz guitarist Sonny Sharrock which was recorded in 1970 in Paris and released on the BYG Actuel label.

Reception

AllMusic awarded the album 2½ stars, stating, " It is an album one wants to like, but it is as difficult to like as the losers at cheerleader tryouts. Not all the problems can be blamed on Big Sonny, but he does decide to lay out on guitar for nearly half of the first side's 17-minute opus... in the end it subtracts from, not adds to, the pleasure of enjoying Sharrock's playing. Of course, there are moments of quality guitar skronking.

Track listing
All compositions by Sonny Sharrock except as indicated
 "27th Day" - 16:55
 "Soon" (Linda Sharrock) - 8:00
 "Monkey-Pockie-Boo" - 8:55

Personnel 
Sonny Sharrock - guitar, slide whistle, vocals
Beb Guérin - bass
Jacques Thollot - drums
Linda Sharrock - vocals

References 

1970 albums
Sonny Sharrock albums
BYG Actuel albums